The 2016 NFL Draft was the 81st annual meeting of National Football League (NFL) franchises to select newly eligible American football players. As in 2015, the draft took place at the Auditorium Theatre and Grant Park in Chicago. The draft began on Thursday, April 28 with the first round, and ended on Saturday, April 30. The Tennessee Titans, the team with the fewest wins in the NFL for the 2015 season, traded the right to the top pick in the draft to the Los Angeles Rams, the first time the top pick was traded before the draft since 2001 when the San Diego Chargers traded their first pick to the Atlanta Falcons. Ohio State became the second school to have three players drafted in the top ten and to have five players drafted in the first round.

Early entrants

Ninety-six underclassmen announced their intention to enter the 2016 NFL Draft as underclassmen, which primarily include juniors and redshirt sophomores who are forgoing future years of college eligibility. In order to be eligible to enter the draft, players must be at least 3 years removed from high school. The deadline for underclassmen to declare for the draft was January 18, 2016.

Overview
The following is the breakdown of the 253 players selected by position:

 36 Linebackers
 31 Wide receivers
 32 Cornerbacks
 22 Defensive tackles
 20 Offensive tackles
 19 Running backs
 19 Safeties
 18 Defensive ends
 15 Quarterbacks
 13 Offensive guards
 11 Tight ends
 8 Centers
 3 Fullbacks
 3 Punters
 1 Long snapper
 1 Placekicker

Player selections

Notable undrafted players

Trades
In the explanations below, (PD) indicates trades completed prior to the start of the draft (i.e. Pre-Draft), while (D) denotes trades that took place during the 2016 draft.

Round one

Round two

Round three

Round four

Round five

Round six

Round seven

Forfeited picks

Supplemental draft
The 2016 supplemental draft was held on July 14, 2016. For each player selected in the supplemental draft, the team forfeits its pick in that round in the draft of the following season. This year, six players were eligible for selection:

 Eddie D'Antuono - LS - Virginia Tech
 Ra'Zahn Howard - DL - Purdue
 Jalen Overstreet - RB - Sam Houston State
 Tee Shepard - CB - Ole Miss
 Rashaun Simonise - WR - Calgary
 Cameron Walton - DE - Concordia

No players were selected.

Summary

Selections by college athletic conference

Schools with multiple draft selections

Selections by position

Notes

References
Trade references

General references

External links
Official Site

National Football League Draft
2010s in Chicago
NFL Draft
Draft
American football in Chicago
2016 in sports in Illinois
NFL Draft
Events in Chicago